Mitko Dimitrov (Bulgarian: Митко Димитров; born 1953 in Dimitrovgrad, Bulgaria) is a prominent Bulgarian businessman. As the owner and CEO of the Payner music company promoting pop-folk music, Dimitrov belongs to the group of the most successful entrepreneurs from South-East Europe region. He discovered and brought to fame many modern stars of the Bulgarian pop-folk music scene.

Biography
Dimitrov is a graduate of the Engineering Faculty at the Technical University of Varna. During the Zhivkov era he worked as a mechanical engineer and later as a chief engineer. In 1990 he started his company Payner.
In 2007 Dimitrov announced that he would run from the lists of the GERB party for the municipal councilor in his family town of Dimitrovgrad. However, after the objection of the party leader Boyko Borisov, Dimitrov withdrew his candidature.

Payner

Notes

External links
 Payner

1953 births
Living people
Bulgarian businesspeople
People from Dimitrovgrad, Bulgaria
Bulgarian musicians